The Archdiocese of Bamako is the Metropolitan Archdiocesan See for the Ecclesiastical province which covers all and only Mali, yet depends on the missionary Roman Congregation for the Evangelization of Peoples.

The cathedral archiepiscopal seat of the archbishop is the Cathédrale du Sacré-Cœur de Jésus, dedicated to the Sacred Heart of Jesus, in national capital Bamako.

Statistics 
As per 2014, it pastorally served 134,982 Catholics (3.1% of 4,332,101 total) on 85,000 km² in 10 parishes and 1 mission with 31 priests (13 diocesan, 18 religious), 159 lay religious (42 brothers, 117 sisters) and 14 seminarians .

History 
 1868: Established as Apostolic Prefecture of Sahara and Sudan 
 1891: Promoted as Apostolic Vicariate of Sahara and Sudan, hence entitled to a titular bishop
 19 July 1901: Renamed as Apostolic Vicariate of French Sudan (the French colonial name of Mali)/ Sahara nel Sudan Francese (Curiate Italian) / Saharen(sis) (Latin adjective), having lost territory to establish the Apostolic Prefecture of Ghardaïa
 2 July 1921: Renamed as Apostolic Vicariate of Bamako / Bamakoën(sis) (Latin adjective), having lost territory to establish Apostolic Vicariate of Ouagadougou (in Upper Volta, the French colonial name of Burkina Faso)
 Lost territory repeatedly : on 1927.12.15 to establish Apostolic Prefecture of Bobo-Dioulasso, on 1937.03.09 to establish Apostolic Prefecture of N’Zérékoré, on 1942.06.09 to establish Apostolic Prefecture of Gao (now its suffragan) and on 1947.06.12 to establish Apostolic Prefecture of Kayes (now its suffragan)
 14 September 1955: Promoted as Metropolitan Archdiocese of Bamako / Bamakoën(sis) (Latin adjective)
 Lost territory again on 1962.03.10 to establish as its suffragan Diocese of Ségou
 It enjoyed a papal visit from Pope John Paul II in January 1990.

Ecclesiastical province 
The Metropolitan's Suffragan sees are the:
 Roman Catholic Diocese of Kayes
 Roman Catholic Diocese of Mopti
 Roman Catholic Diocese of San
 Roman Catholic Diocese of Ségou
 Roman Catholic Diocese of Sikasso

Bishops 
(all Roman Rite)

Apostolic Prefect of Sahara and Sudan 
 Bishop Charles Lavigerie, M Afr (1868 – 13 March 1891 see below) (Cardinal in 1882); this tenure as Apostolic Prefect is not listed in Catholic-hierarchy

Apostolic Vicars of Sahara and Sudan 
 Cardinal Charles Lavigerie, M Afr (see above 13 March 1891 – 26 November 1892)
 Anatole-Joseph Toulotte, M Afr (26 November 1892 – 18 October 1897)
 Augustin Prosper Hacquard, M Afr (19 January 1898 – no April 1901)

Apostolic Vicars of French Sudan 
 Hippolyte Louis Bazin, M Afr (27 July 1901 – 30 November 1910)
 Alexis Lemaître, M Afr (24 February 1911 – 28 July 1920), appointed Coadjutor Archbishop of Carthage, Tunisia

Apostolic Vicars of Bamako 
 Emile-Fernand Sauvant, M Afr (8 July 1921 – 6 April 1928)
 Paul-Marie Molin, M Afr (2 July 1928 – 21 January 1949)
 Pierre Louis Leclerc, M Afr (25 December 1949 – 14 September 1955 see below)

Archbishops of Bamako 
 Pierre Louis Leclerc, M Afr (see above 14 September 1955 – 10 March 1962), appointed Archbishop (personal title) of Ségou
 Luc Auguste Sangaré (10 March 1962 – 11 February 1998)
 Jean Zerbo (27 June 1998 – ) (Cardinal in 2017)

Auxiliary Bishop
Jean Zerbo (1988-1994), appointed Bishop of Mopti; later returned here as Archbishop; future Cardinal

See also 
 Catholic Church in Mali
 List of Catholic dioceses in Mali

Sources and external links 
 GCatholic.org - data for all sections

Roman Catholic dioceses in Mali
Bamako
Roman Catholic dioceses and prelatures established in the 19th century
A